Steven Maurer (born July 20, 1947) is a veteran of foreign war, former mayor of Botkins, Ohio, and former member of the Ohio Senate, serving from 1981 to 1984. He represented the 12th District, which encompassed much of West-Central Ohio.  During the eight years of President Barack Obama's administration, he served as the State of Ohio Executive Director of the United States Department of Agriculture Farm Service Agency.

References
 

Democratic Party Ohio state senators
Living people
1947 births